Harald Halfdansson may refer to:

 Harald Klak (c. 785 – c. 852), King of Denmark
 Harald Fairhair (c. 850 – c. 932), first King of Norway